Euseius natalensis is a species of mite in the family Phytoseiidae.

References

natalensis
Articles created by Qbugbot
Animals described in 1965